Unworthy Republic: The Dispossession of Native Americans and the Road to Indian Territory is a 2020 book by historian Claudio Saunt that focuses on the forced removal of Native Americans from the eastern United States during the 19th Century. It was awarded the Bancroft Prize in American history, and was a finalist for the National Book Award for Nonfiction.

Synopsis
Saunt describes the US policy of Indian Removal in the Eastern United States. Saunt highlights the relationship between slavery and the expulsion of Native Americans. He shows that the deportation of Native Americans allowed for the expansion of southern slavery, and for investment by Wall Street Bankers and the northern financial industry. Saunt covers numerous important events including but not limited to the Black Hawk War, the Trail of Tears, and the Seminole Wars.

Awards
Finalist for National Book Award for Nonfiction
Longlisted for the  Cundill History Prize
Publishers Weekly Top 10 Books of the Year
Washington Post Top 10 Books of the Year
New York Times Critics' Top Books of the Year
Bancroft Prize
 Robert F. Kennedy Book Award
 Ridenhour Book Prize

References

External links
 

2020 non-fiction books
English-language books
W. W. Norton & Company books
Bancroft Prize-winning works
Non-fiction books about Native Americans
Books about Native American history
History books about the United States